General Sir Thomas Stirling, 5th Baronet (8 October 1733 – 8 May 1808) was a senior officer of the British Army during the American War of Independence.

Early life and background
Stirling was in 1733 in Perthshire, Scotland, a scion of the Stirling baronets of Ardoch. He was the second son of Sir Henry Stirling, 3rd Baronet, and Anne Gordon.

Military career
In 1758 Stirling came to America and served in the French and Indian War's Canadian campaign. After the war, Britain took control of the land between the American colonies west to the Mississippi and north of the Ohio. He departed Fort Pitt going down the Ohio to Fort de Chartres to take possession of Illinois Country for the Crown in October 1765. In 1767 Stirling went back to Great Britain, but returned to America later to serve with the British forces during the American War of Independence. Promoted to the rank of General, Stirling served as Colonel of the 41st Regiment of Foot from 1790 until his death.

Personal life
He succeeded to the baronetcy upon the death of his elder brother, Sir William Stirling, 4th Baronet, who left no male issue. Sir Thomas was a granduncle of Waite Stirling, who would become the first Anglican Bishop of the Falkland Islands.
 Sir Thomas died unmarried at Strowan in 1808.

References

1733 births
1808 deaths
Baronets in the Baronetage of Nova Scotia
British Army generals
British Army personnel of the American Revolutionary War
British military personnel of the French and Indian War
Scottish generals